Degiq was a region and a family of the old Armenia  300–800.

See also
List of regions of ancient Armenia

Early medieval Armenian regions